Beautiful World is the tenth studio album of the Japanese boy band Arashi. The album was released on July 6, 2011, in Japan under their record label J Storm in two editions: a limited edition version with a 48-page booklet and a regular CD version with a 32-page booklet. The album debuted at number-one on the Oricon weekly album chart, selling 631,000 copies, making it their third consecutive album to reach sales of more than half a million copies. As of December 2011, the album has sold more than a million copies. According to Oricon, Beautiful World is the best-selling album of 2011 in Japan. It was released digitally on February 7, 2020.

Album information
Both the first press and regular versions contain eighteen tracks. On November 28, 2011, a limited edition of the album was released exclusively by the shopping site "7-net". It consists of a bonus track , composed by member Kazunari Ninomiya and lyrics penned by the group.

Songs
"Beautiful World" includes five of the group's previously released singles: "To be free", "Love Rainbow", "Dear Snow", "Hatenai Sora" and "Lotus". "To be free" was used as the song for Mistuya Cider commercial with member Sho Sakurai as the endorser."Love Rainbow" was the theme song for the drama  starring member Jun Matsumoto. "Dear Snow" and "Hatenai Sora" were used as theme songs for the movie "Ōoku: The Inner Chambers" and drama  respectively, starring member Kazunari Ninomiya. "Lotus" was used as theme song for  starring member Masaki Aiba.

"Tooku Made" was used as the theme song for a Japan Airlines commercial starring the group.

Promotion
It was announced on July 24, 2011, that Japan Airlines will use two Boeing 777-200 bearing both the images of the members of Arashi and the words "ARASHI Beautiful World". The planes titled  will be used for domestic flights, and the album with specially designed in-flight covers will be available, from July 25, 2011, to January 27, 2012. This marks the group's second time to have their images featured on an aircraft of the same airline.

Track listing

Personnel
Credits adapted from liner notes.

Musicians

 Arashi – lead vocals , gaya 
 Sho Sakurai – rap 
 Ko-saku – chorus arrangement , 
 Shotaro – chorus arrangement 
 Kumi Sasaki – chorus 
 Shiori Sasakii – chorus 
 Eriko Miedai – chorus 
 Yoko Kazumotoi – chorus 
 Kimio Yamane – clarinet 
 Ha-j – co-programming 
 Youwhich – co-programming 
 Yutaka Odawara – drums 
 John Robinson – drums 
 Takumi Ogasawara – drums 
 Toru Kawamura – drums 
 Akira Jimbo – drums 
 Mana Ohkubo – fiddle 
 Hideyo Takakuwa – flute 
 The Gaya-xy – gaya 
 Hiroomi Shitara – acoustic guitar , 
 Nozomi Furukawa – acoustic guitar and electric guitar 
 Hirokazu Ogura – acoustic guitar and electric guitar 
 Hiroyuki Taneda – acoustic guitar and electric guitar 
 Takashi Yamaguchi – acoustic guitar 
 Nathan East – bass guitar 
 Yuzo Oka – bass guitar 
 Hideyuki Komatsu – bass guitar 
 Hideki Matsubara – bass guitar 
 Hitoki – bass guitar 
 Kenji Okuda – electric guitar 
 Takashi Masuzaki – electric guitar 
 Otohiko Fujita – horn 
 Yasushi Katsumata – horn 
 Mana Yoshinaga – koto 
 Satoshi Shoji – oboe 
 Kaori Ono – percussion 
 Hirofumi Sasaki – strings and co-programming 
 Gen Ittetsu Strings – strings 
 Konno Strings – strings 
 Manabe Strings – strings 
 Tadashi Tatabe – synthesizer 
 Aaron Heick – soprano sax and flute 
 Masakuni Takeno – tenor Sax 
 Ryoji Ihara – tenor sax 
 Ikuo Kakehashi – tabla and percussion 
 Mari Yasui – tin whistle 
 Koji Nishimura – trumpet 
 Masahiko Sugasaka – trumpet 
 Eric Miyashiro – trumpet 
 Kosuke Nakayama – trumpet 
 Katsumi Nomura – turntable

Production

 Johnny H. Kitagawa – executive producer
 Julie K. – producer
 Shigeru Tanida – recording, mixing
 Teturo Takeuchi – recording, mixing
 Mikiro Yamada – recording
 Akitomo Takakuwa – recording
 Yohei Takita – recording
 Hideyuki Matsuhashi – recording
 Masahito Komori – 2nd engineer
 Hiroaki Suzuki – 2nd engineer
 Kohei Nakaya – 2nd engineer
 Naoya Tsuruta – 2nd engineer
 Hiroshi Kawasaki – mastering
 Tsutomu Satomi – musician coordinator
 Asuka Tozawa – musician coordinator
 Yasuhiro Okuya – creative direction
 Go Matsuda – art direction and design
 Ryotaro Kawashima – design
 Akira Kitajima – photography
 Masumi Sakamoto – styling
 Ayumi Naito – hair and make-up
 Kosuke Abe – hair and make-up
 Yuuki Yonezawa – set design

Release history

References

2011 albums
Arashi albums
Japanese-language albums
J Storm albums